Admetovis is a genus of moths of the family Noctuidae.

Species
 Admetovis oxymorus Grote, 1873
 Admetovis similaris Barnes, 1904
 Admetovis icarus Crabo, 2018

References
 Admetovis at Markku Savela's Lepidoptera and Some Other Life Forms
 Natural History Museum Lepidoptera genus database

Hadeninae
Noctuoidea genera